Jaroslav Kopřiva (born 23 October 1990) is a Czech bobsledder. He competed in the four-man event at the 2018 Winter Olympics.

References

1990 births
Living people
Czech male bobsledders
Olympic bobsledders of the Czech Republic
Bobsledders at the 2018 Winter Olympics
Place of birth missing (living people)